Sidharth Nath Singh (born 1 October 1963) is an Indian politician and the Cabinet Minister in the Government of Uttar Pradesh. He is one of the official spokespersons of the Bharatiya Janata Party. He is a grandson of former  Prime Minister of India Lal Bahadur Shastri. Suman Shastri (1936-2002), his mother, was the daughter of Lal Bahadur Shastri. He is BJP state in-charge of Andhra Pradesh and co-in-charge of West Bengal. He is also serving as a Bharatiya Janata Party National Secretary.

Political career
S N Singh became Member of the Uttar Pradesh Legislative Assembly from Allahabad West constituency in 2017 by defeating two-time BSP MLA Pooja Pal by 45,000 votes. He is currently (since 2017) a cabinet minister in the UP government, with the portfolio of Health.

References

External links 

 Office Bearers 

Living people
Politicians from Allahabad
Uttar Pradesh MLAs 2017–2022
Bharatiya Janata Party politicians from Uttar Pradesh
State cabinet ministers of Uttar Pradesh
Yogi ministry
1963 births
Uttar Pradesh MLAs 2022–2027